Matavai may refer to:

 Matavai (Gagaʻifomauga), a village in Samoa
 Matavai Bay, Tahiti
 A.S. Matavai, a Tahitian football club